Ma Tau Wai is one of the 25 constituencies in the Kowloon City District of Hong Kong which was created in 1991.

The constituency loosely covers Ma Tau Wai with the estimated population of 20,629.

Councillors represented

Election results

2010s

2000s

1990s

Notes

References

Constituencies of Hong Kong
Constituencies of Kowloon City District Council
1991 establishments in Hong Kong
Constituencies established in 1991
Ma Tau Wai